Marshall Brown may refer to:

Marshall Brown (musician) (1920–1983), American jazz musician and educator
Marshall Brown (basketball, born 1918) (1918–2008), American basketball player 
Marshall Brown (basketball, born 1985), American basketball player

See also
Marshall Browne (1935–2014), Australian crime fiction writer
Marshall Browns, an East Texas League minor league baseball team in the United States